KSTV (1510 AM, Fiesta 1510 AM) is a radio station broadcasting a Spanish Variety music format. It is licensed to Stephenville, Texas, United States, and is owned by Robert Elliott, Jr., through licensee Villecom LLC.

References

External links

STV
STV
STV